David Ambler (born 15 September 1989) is a New Zealand sprinter.

Ambler's personal best time of 10.35 for the 100 metres was the New Zealand junior record until it was broken by Edward Osei-Nketia in 2019. He ranks as the fifth fastest New Zealander over 100 m. He attended Christchurch Boys' High School and Florida State University (2010–2013).

Personal bests

Achievements

References

Living people
1989 births
New Zealand male sprinters
People educated at Christchurch Boys' High School